The Forest of Sénart is located in the French department of Essonne.  It covers 3,000 hectares in area, this forest is very important to the local population. The local government has kept roads and agricultural companies from cutting down parts of this forest. There are roughly 2-3 million visitors a year, and the government spends 1.2 million euros a year maintaining the forest.

The forest inspired the 1826 pasticcio La forêt de Sénart by Parisian Castil-Blaze, where he openly incorporated music from the opera Euryanthe against the protests of composer Carl Maria von Weber. The experience drove Weber to lobby German theaters and sovereigns to control distribution of his next opera, Oberon – an important incident in the creation of modern copyright law.

Geography of Essonne
Forests of France
Tourist attractions in Île-de-France
Tourist attractions in Essonne